Aaron Halfaker (born December 27, 1983) is principal applied scientist at Microsoft Research. He previously served as a research scientist at the Wikimedia Foundation until 2020.

Education
Halfaker earned a Bachelor of Science degree in computer science from the College of St. Scholastica in 2006, where he started off as a physical therapy major but switched to computer science after taking a programming class with Diana Johnson. He subsequently earned a PhD in computer science from the GroupLens Research lab at the University of Minnesota in 2013.

Career and research
Halfaker is known for his research on Wikipedia and the decrease in the number of active editors of the site. He has said that Wikipedia began a "decline phase" around 2007 and has continued to decline since then. Halfaker has also studied software agents (bots) on Wikipedia, and the way they affect new contributors to the site. While a graduate student he developed a tool for Wikipedia editing called Snuggle with Stuart Geiger. Snuggle tackles vandalism on Wikipedia and highlights constructive contributions by new editors. He has also built an artificial intelligence (AI) service called Objective Revision Evaluation Service (ORES), used to identify vandalism on Wikipedia and distinguish it from good faith edits.

References

University of Minnesota College of Science and Engineering alumni
Living people
American computer scientists
Wikipedia researchers
Wikimedia Foundation staff members
Human–computer interaction researchers
College of St. Scholastica alumni
People from Virginia, Minnesota
1983 births
American Wikimedians